Nagymaros is a town in Pest county, Hungary.

Etymology
The name comes from Maroš, the Slavic form of Marianus.  Nagymaros—"Greater Maros" (Hungarian). The first written mention is Morus (1257).

Notable people
György Szabados (1939–2011), jazz musician
Mihály Nagymarosi (1919–2002), footballer
László Szalma (b. 1957), long jumper
Tibor Gánti (1933–2009), biochemist

Twin towns – sister cities

Nagymaros is twinned with:
 Gabčíkovo, Slovakia
 Grevesmühlen, Germany
 Velyki Heivtsi, Ukraine

References

External links

  in Hungarian
 Street map 

Populated places in Pest County